Kleist Sykes (1894–1949) was a Tanganyikan political activist. He helped form the Tanganyika African Association.

Sykes was born in Pangani, Tanga Region, to father Sykes Mbuwane, a Zulu mercenary hired by the German Empire, and a Nyaturu mother. After his father died, Sykes moved with his godfather, Effendi Plantan, to Dar Es Salaam, and would later fight for the Germans in the First World War.

After the war, Sykes worked for the Tanganyika Railway. He met Dr. James Aggrey, a Ghanaian teacher, who inspired Sykes to form the Tanganyika African Association (AA) in 1929, along with friends including Mzee bin Sudi, Cecil Matola, Suleiman Mjisu and Raikes Kusi. In the 1930s, AA members built the organization's headquarters at New Street, where the Tanganyika African National Union would later be created in 1954.

Sykes was the first African to join the Tanganyika Chamber of Commerce, and the second African to serve in colonial Dar es Salaam's Municipal Council.

Sykes had three sons, Abdulwahid, Ally, and Abbas, who would also have prominent careers in Tanzania.

The Campaign against Abushiri bin Harith and Chief Mkwawa 1889 

Harmine von Wissman landed in Pangani at the turn of the 19th century with a mercenary force of Zulu warriors. The Zulu mercenaries were under the leadership of Chief Mohosh of Inhambane, Mozambique. They were recruited from a village named Kwa Likunyi in Mozambique. Among the mercenaries was my grandfather, Sykes Mbuwane. This was just after the Berlin Conference of 1884 in which Africa was partitioned between imperial powers in Europe. This caused resistance and from 1888 to 1889 the people of Tanganyika rose up in arms to defend their freedom. Germans had a military camp at Pangani, the small coastal town few miles from Tanga which in those days was an important town in the German administration. It was from this German camp in Pangani that my grandfather and his fellow mercenaries under the command of Chief Mohosh and mobilised under von Wissman prepared themselves to go into action against the local population resisting German rule. The Germans had also recruited Nubian soldiers from Sudan who, together with the Zulu, fought against Abushiri bin Salim bin Harith for almost two years.

Harmine von Wissman was an explorer and soldier. He led the suppression of the resistance of 1888–1889 and was made Governor of German East Africa (1895–1896). Wissman, with the support of the Zulu warriors and the Nubians and in keeping with the agreement of the Berlin Conference, suppressed the resistance against German rule in Tanganyika led by Abushiri and Chief Mkwawa.

Abushiri was later captured and hanged in Pangani in December 1889. After Abushiri's defeat Germans were engaged in a war with Chief Mkwawa of the Wahehe from 1891 to 1894.  In July 1894 Mkwawa rather than be captured, took his own life. Both Abushiri and Chief Mkwawa met their end fighting against foreign domination while my grandfather died as a mercenary soldier fulfilling his contractual obligation to his employer and paymaster, the Germans.

As fate would have it half a century after the death of Chief Mkwawa, his grandson, Chief Adam Sapi Mkwawa, and the grandson of Sykes Mbuwane, Abdulwahid Sykes, met at Kalenga in 1954. Kalenga was once the fort of Chief Mkwawa.  In the presence of Dossa Aziz, Chief Mkwawa secretly enrolled as a member of the Tanganyika African National Union (TANU), the party of independence, which Abdulawahid, Julius Nyerere, John Rupia, other patriots and I had formed the same year with the aim of driving out the British from our country.

At that time there were two prominent families of South African Zulu origin in Dar es Salaam: Abdallah Kleist Sykes, formerly known as Kleist Plantan, and his distant relatives, the three Plantan brothers: Mwalimu Thomas Plantan, (the title Mwalimu given to him because he was a schoolteacher), Schneider Abdillah Plantan and Ramadhan Mashado Plantan.

Kleist Sykes was known as Kleist Plantan, after taking the name Plantan from Effendi Plantan, a relative who brought up our father after the death of his father Sykes Mbuwane. 'Effendi' was a military rank in the Turkish army, probably incorporated in the German forces during the First World War when Turkey and Germany were allies.

In fact, Effendi Plantan's Zulu name was Shangaan after a village in Inhambane, Mozambique, where Sykes Mbuwane and Effendi Plantan originally came from.  Those two families could be spotted by their peculiar names, a mixture of German, Portuguese and English, which were uncommon for Muslims in East Africa. 'Kleist' and 'Schneider' which are German; Mashado which is Portuguese and  'Thomas' which is English.

All of them, Kleist, Mwalimu Thomas, Schneider and Mashado came to play leading roles in the struggle against colonialism and in Muslim politics before and after independence. It is unfortunate that these patriots' Muslim names never came very much into the fore.  They were better known by the names of their Zulu forefathers. I remember when I was very little my friends used to ask me if it is true I was a Muslim because of my names.

There was also the family of Aziz Ali Dossa who originally came from Tanga.  He was a close friend of my father and was the first African to own a car although he was always chauffeur driven. He was a building contractor but was restricted to building houses for Africans only. Colonial regulations barred him from acquiring a licence to enable him to undertake construction of storied buildings. This was the preserve of mainly Indian contractors. Aziz Ali built many mosques in Dar es Salaam. When there was no electricity he took on himself to providing hurricane lamps to light all mosques in the municipality. His son would drop the lamps at the mosques before maghrib prayers and would collect them after insha to be taken home for cleaning and for making them ready for the following day. When Aziz Ali died in 1951 Tanganyika Standard newspaper's notice on his death called him "a builder of mosques".

Aziz Ali was an important landlord and like Kleist he owned several houses in Dar es Salaam. The two were the only Africans in Dar es Salaam permitted by the government to drink beer, at the time an exclusive drink of Europeans. The British were of the opinion that Africans would go berserk if they drank beer as they could not hold it. Kleist and Aziz Ali were issued with special cards [LICENCES???] which they had to produce whenever they wanted to buy a drink either from a bar or a liquor shop. In those days most of the liquor shops in Dar es Salaam were owned by Goans.

Kleist and Aziz Ali were good friends and got on well together. They were the African elite, the cultured townsmen of Dar es Salaam. Aziz Ali had many wives and he therefore sired many children. Among all his children only two came to be prominent – Dossa Aziz and Hamza Aziz. Dossa was among the 17 founders of TANU and one of the financiers of the party. Hamza, his young brother, came to serve as Inspector-General of Police after independence.

Hamza and my young brother Abbas came to be great friends, calling each other by pet names. Hamza was "Nat King Cole" and Abbas was "Spencer Tracey". Hamza used to sing songs by Nat King Cole and Abbas was a great admirer of the American actor Spencer Tracey. Hamza was to marry into a prominent family in Kilimanjaro; he tied the knot with the daughter of Chief Abdiel Shangali of Machame. Chief Shangali and Kidaha Makwaia were the first African members of the Legislative Council having been nominated in 1945 by Governor Edward Twining.

As indicated earlier Kleist Sykes was a chain smoker who loved his coffee. He would sit outside his house with his friends and order endless cups of coffee when coffee was sold by vendors making the rounds in Dar es Salaaam. When he died of bronchitis on 23 May 1949 Dar es Salaam had never seen such a well-attended funeral.

Kleist Sykes had left his mark on the history of Dar es Salaam. He had founded the African Association which had propelled Africans into politics and he had also founded Al Jamiatul Islamiyya fi Tanganyika, the Muslim organisation which not only stood up against the threat of Christian missionaries, but laid the foundation for future organisation of Muslims as a political entity.

Kleist Sykes had also initiated a plan to built a school for Muslim children of Dar es Salaam so that Muslim children could get education without the fear of being converted to Christianity were they to be enrolled in missionary schools. He organized Muslims to contribute money for the school and this they did with relish.

When the Aga Khan came to Tanganyika in 1936 and was told of this project he donated money and the school was built. My father was in the Maulid Committee which organized celebrations to mark the birth of The Prophet Muhammad. He remained a member of the committee until when he passed away.

Kleist Sykes also served on the Dar es Salaam Municipal Council, the second African to do so in colonial Tanganyika. He successfully ventured into business which was the monopoly and domain of Asians. He joined the Chamber of Commerce and was probably the first African to do so. The Chamber of Commerce was an important power lobby of the Asian business class. He did more than his share in the political development of Africans of Tanganyika. The death of Kleist Sykes signalled the end of an era and the emerging of a new one.

References

Kleist Sykes – A History of Tanzania

Klesit Sykes – The Sykes Boys Reviewed

1949 deaths
1894 births
People from Tanga Region
German military personnel of World War I
Tanganyikan city councillors